Ivan Pidkova or Ioan Potcoavă (died 16 June 1578), also known as Ioan Creţul, and Nicoară Potcoavă among Romanians, was a prominent Cossack ataman, and short-lived Voivode (Prince) of Moldavia (November–December 1577). His moniker ("pidkova" in Ukrainian/"potcoavă" in Romanian – "horseshoe") is said to originate in the fact that he used to ride his stallions to the point of breaking off their horseshoes; another version says that he could break and unbend both horseshoes and coins with his fists. He is perhaps best known as the hero of Ukraine's bard Taras Shevchenko's poem Ivan Pidkova (1840). Celebrated as a Ukrainian hero he led the Moldavian and Ukrainian struggle against Turkish domination. In his poem on Pidkova, Shevcenko "lets his mind travel over the Ukrainian past," expressing his admiration for the Ukrainian Cossacks.

Biography
His ethnic origins are not known, but he is generally regarded as of Ukrainian ethnicity.  However, Paul Robert Magocsi states he was a Ukrainian cossack of  Romanian origin. More broadly, Pidkova was a "Kozak otaman who led the Moldavian and Ukrainian struggle against the Turks." After rising to prominence as a successful soldier, he became a leader (ataman) and the sworn brother of Hetman Yakiv Shah, elected by the Cossacks of the Registered Zaporozhian Host from Ukraine neighbouring Moldavia. In 1574, Ioan Vodă cel Cumplit, whose brother Pidkova claimed to be, had named the territory "Our Country from over the Dniester". Other Moldavian Atamans and Hetmans of the Cossacks were Grigore Lobodă (Hryhoriy Loboda; 1593–1596) and Dănilă Apostol (Danylo Apostol; 1727–1734).

Pidkova was one of the so-called Domnişori ("Little Princes"), named so because of a more or less based claims of belonging to Moldavian ruling families, thus exercising demands of the throne. Claiming to be Ioan III Vodă's half-brother, he together with Hetman Yakiv Shah chased Peter the Lame from the throne and resisted the first wave of violent Ottoman reaction. The Turks, their Wallachian vassal Mihnea Turcitul and their Transylvania vassal and Polish partner, King Stefan Báthory, managed to remove him. In the end, Pidkova was taken prisoner by Poles and decapitated in Lviv.

He is the hero of Taras Shevchenko's romantic 1839 poem Ivan Pidkova, of Romanian writer Mihail Sadoveanu's socialist realist 1952 novel Nicoară Potcoavă, and of several Cossack ballads. His monument is placed on one of the small central squares in Lviv, Ukraine.

See also
List of Ukrainian rulers

References

Sources
 Grigore Ureche, Letopiseţul Ţării Moldovei

Pidkova, Ivan
Pidkova, Ivan
Pidkova, Ivan
Pidkova, Ivan
Executed Ukrainian people
Year of birth unknown
16th-century monarchs in Europe
Executed monarchs